Claude-Léon Mascaux (June 13, 1882 – March 8, 1965) was a French sculptor, and medallist. He won a bronze medal in the art competitions at the 1924 Summer Olympics for creating seven sports medals.

References

External links
Claude-Léon Mascaux's profile at databaseOlympics
Claude-Léon Mascaux's profile at Sports Reference.com

1882 births
1965 deaths
Olympic bronze medalists in art competitions
People from Saint-Germain-en-Laye
20th-century French sculptors
French male sculptors
Medalists at the 1924 Summer Olympics
Olympic competitors in art competitions